Ptc1 is a type Two C phosphatase involved in the mating decision of yeast. Ptc1 competes with Fus3 for control of the 4 phosphorylation sites on the scaffold protein Ste5. Presence of the mating pheromone α-factor causes Ptc1 to be recruited to Ste5. This recruitment takes place via a 4 amino acid motif in the Ste5 phosphosites.

Ptc1 is also involved in regulating the osmotic stress of yeast, especially via inactivation of Hog1, a member of the MAPK pathway. This inactivation occurred as a result of dephosphorylation of the phosphotheronine but not the phosphotyrosine residue in the phosphorylation lip of Hog1.

It can be localized to the cytoplasm and nucleus.

Biological Processes 
Ptc1 is involved in the following biological processes: 
Inactivation of MAPK activity in osmosensory signalling pathways
Mitochondrial inheritance
Pheromone-dependent signal transduction in conjugation with cellular fusion
Protein dephosphorylation
tRNA splicing via. Endonucleolytic cleavage and ligation

References 

Enzymes of known structure